This is a list of matches played by the Rwanda women's national football team.

2014

2016

2018

2021

2022

References

Rwanda national football team 
Women's national association football team results